Bradley Francis Granger (March 12, 1825 – November 4, 1882) was an American politician and a United States Representative from the U.S. state of Michigan.

Early life
Granger was born in Lowville, New York and attended the public schools. At the age of fifteen he began the study of law with Stacy & Beaman, at Tecumseh, Lenawee county, Michigan, until he reached his majority and was admitted to the bar on October 12, 1847.

Career
Granger commenced practice in Tecumseh, Michigan, and in the summer of 1847 he moved to Kent county, and engaged in farming and lumbering, but returned to Manchester in the spring of 1848. In the spring of 1849, he was elected Justice of the Peace, and served for four years while owning and operating a farm. He continued to practice after moving to Ann Arbor, Washtenaw County, Michigan, and served as clerk of Washtenaw county in 1852 and Judge of Probate in 1856.

Elected as a Republican from Michigan's 1st congressional district to the Thirty-seventh Congress, Granger served as United States Representative from March 4, 1861 to March 3, 1863.  He continued in the practice of law until his death.

Death
Granger died in Ann Arbor, Washtenaw County, Michigan, November 4, 1882 (age 57 years, 237 days). He is interred at Forest Hill Cemetery, Ann Arbor, Michigan.

Family life
In October 1848, Granger married Susan A. De Lamater, niece of Hon. William J. Hough. The couple had four children.

References

External links

Political Graveyard

 

1825 births
1888 deaths
People from Lowville, New York
Republican Party members of the United States House of Representatives from Michigan
Politicians from Ann Arbor, Michigan
People from Tecumseh, Michigan
19th-century American politicians